Sheen may refer to:

Places
 Sheen or West Sheen, an alternative name for Richmond, London, England
 East Sheen
 North Sheen
 Sheen Priory
 Sheen, Staffordshire, a village and civil parish in the Staffordshire Moorlands, England
 Sheenboro, Quebec, Canada, formerly Sheen Township and Sheen-Esher-Aberdeen-et-Malakoff United Township Municipality

People with the given name
 Sheen Kaaf Nizam (born 1947), Urdu poet and literary scholar
 Sheen T. Kassouf (1929–2006), American economist

Other uses
 Sheen (surname)
 The Venerable Servant of God Archbishop Fulton John Sheen, Catholic radio and TV personality, former Bishop of Rochester
 Gloss (paint), a measure corresponding to different levels of specular reflection
 A thin layer of a substance (such as oil) spread on a solid or liquid surface and causing thin-film interference
 Sheen Estevez, fictional character from the Nickelodeon series Jimmy Neutron
 Mr Sheen, a cleaning product
 Sheen Genus, computer game character
 Sheen, alternate name for Semitic alphanumeric character Shin (Šin)
 Sheen (film), a 2004 film
 Planet Sheen, a television series
 Sheen Magazine, bimonthly magazine about African-American entertainment and culture

See also
 Barry Sheene (1950–2003), British World Champion Grand Prix motorcycle road racer
 Bob Sheens, Australian rugby league footballer
 Tim Sheens (born 1950), Australian rugby league footballer and coach
 Sheena (disambiguation)